Alvadon Basil Williams (21 November 1949 – 25 October 2015) was a West Indian cricketer who played in seven Test matches from 1978 to 1979.

He was married to Patricia Williams and together they had two sons, Basil Williams and Germaine Williams, who became the famous rapper known as Canibus.

He later had a daughter, Gabrielle Williams.

References

1949 births
2015 deaths
West Indies Test cricketers
Cricketers who made a century on Test debut
Jamaican cricketers
Jamaica cricketers
Jamaican emigrants to the United Kingdom
People from Saint Catherine Parish